The 2004 Waveney Council election took place on 10 June 2004 to elect members of Waveney District Council in Suffolk, England. One third of the council was up for election and the council stayed under no overall control.

Election result

Ward results

References

2004 English local elections
2004
2000s in Suffolk